All Saints' Church, Barnby in the Willows, is a Grade I listed parish church in the Church of England in Barnby in the Willows.

History
The church dates from the 13th century.  It comprises a chancel, nave and two aisles of the 13th century and a west tower which is 15th century. The altar rails are of the early 17th century.

The chancel windows have some very unusual tracery which may date from the 17th century. Inside is a Norman arcade and a delightful collection of 15th century poppy heads on bench ends.

It is part of a benefice with St Giles' Church, Balderton and All Saints' Church, Coddington.

See also
Grade I listed buildings in Nottinghamshire
Listed buildings in Barnby in the Willows

References

Church of England church buildings in Nottinghamshire
Grade I listed churches in Nottinghamshire